Congo, officially Republic of the Congo, competed at the 2016 Summer Olympics in Rio de Janeiro, from August 5 to 21, 2016. This was the nation's twelfth appearance at the Summer Olympics, since its debut in 1964. Congolese athletes did not attend the 1968 Summer Olympics in Mexico City, and the 1976 Summer Olympics in Montreal because of the African boycott.

Congolese Olympics & Sports Committee sent the nation's largest delegation to the Games in a non-boycotting edition. A total of ten athletes, seven men and three women, were selected to the team across five different sports, with two of them returning from London 2012. Table tennis player Suraju Saka, who competed at his third Games, was the oldest (aged 40) and most experienced member of the squad. Meanwhile, shot putter and reigning All-African Games champion Franck Elemba served as the nation's flag bearer in the opening ceremony.

Congo narrowly missed out on its first ever Olympic medal in Rio de Janeiro, as Franck Elemba placed fourth in the men's shot put.

Athletics (track and field)
 
Congolese athletes have so far achieved qualifying standards in the following athletics events (up to a maximum of 3 athletes in each event):

Track & road events

Field events

Boxing
 
Congo entered two boxers to compete in each of the following weight classes into the Olympic competition, signifying the nation's return to the sport for the first time since 1980. Dival Malonga and Anauel Ngamissengue received spare berths freed up by Morocco as the next highest-ranked boxers, not yet qualified, at the 2016 African Qualification Tournament.

Judo

Congo qualified one judoka for the men's heavyweight category (+100 kg) at the Games, signifying the nation's Olympic return to the sport for the first time since 2004. Deo Gracia Ngokaba earned a continental quota spot from the African region as Congo's top-ranked judoka outside of direct qualifying position in the IJF World Ranking List of May 30, 2016.

Swimming

Congo received a Universality invitations from FINA to send two swimmers (one male and one female) to the Olympics.

Table tennis
 
Congo entered three athletes into the table tennis competition at the Games. Chinese-born players Wang Jianan and Han Xing secured places each in the men's and women's singles by virtue of a top four finish at the 2015 All-Africa Games. They were eventually joined by three-time Olympian Suraju Saka, who finished in the top two at the African Qualification Tournament in Khartoum, Sudan.

References

External links 
 
 

Nations at the 2016 Summer Olympics
2016
Olympics